Cullykhan Castle was a castle located in Aberdeenshire, Scotland.

Located overlooking Cullykhan Bay,  are the earth mound remains of the castle. The castle was constructed upon a hillfort, that had been constructed to defend the area from Viking raids. The castle was held by the Troup family in the 14th century.

References

Notes

Castles in Aberdeenshire
Ruined castles in Aberdeenshire